Aechmea bromeliifolia is a bromeliad native to southern Mexico, Central America, Trinidad, and South America as far south as northern Argentina.

Description
Aechmea bromeliifolia can be found growing on the ground or as an epiphyte both in hot jungles and in arid regions at an altitude of up to 2,500 feet.  It grows bright green leaves that have prominent spines and a bottle-shaped rosette.  The branched inflorescence bears red bracts with greenish-yellow petals; the flowers are followed by black berries that are considered edible.  The red form of this plant is sometimes sold as Aechmea Schiedeana.

Cultivars
 Aechmea 'Crossbands'

References

External links
   Aechmea bromeliifolia 
   Aechmea bromeliifolia

bromeliifolia
Flora of South America
Flora of Central America
Flora of Mexico
Flora of Trinidad and Tobago
Plants described in 1806
Taxa named by Edward Rudge
Flora without expected TNC conservation status